This uniform polyhedron compound is a symmetric arrangement of 20 triangular prisms, aligned in pairs with the axes of three-fold rotational symmetry of an icosahedron.

It results from composing the two enantiomorphs of the compound of 10 triangular prisms. In doing so, the vertices of the two enantiomorphs coincide, with the result that the full compound has two triangular prisms incident on each of its vertices.

Related polyhedra 

This compound shares its vertex arrangement with three uniform polyhedra as follows:

References 
.

Polyhedral compounds